The Z4 was arguably the world's first commercial digital computer. It was designed, and manufactured by early computer scientist Konrad Zuse's company Zuse Apparatebau, for an order placed by Henschel & Son, in 1942; though only partially assembled in Berlin, then completed in Göttingen, and not delivered by the defeat of Nazi Germany, in 1945. The Z4 was Zuse's final target for the Z3 design. Like the earlier Z2, it comprised a combination of mechanical memory and electromechanical logic, so was not a true electronic computer.

Construction

The Z4 was very similar to the Z3 in its design but was significantly enhanced in a number of respects. The memory consisted of 32-bit rather than 22-bit floating point words. The Program Construction Unit (Planfertigungsteil) punched the program tapes, making programming and correcting programs for the machine much easier by the use of symbolic operations and memory cells. Numbers were entered and output as decimal floating-point even though the internal working was in binary. The machine had a large repertoire of instructions including square root, MAX, MIN and sine. Conditional tests included tests for infinity. When delivered to ETH Zurich in 1950 the machine had a conditional branch facility added and could print on a Mercedes typewriter. There were two program tapes where the second could be used to hold a subroutine. (Originally six were planned.)

In 1944, Zuse was working on the Z4 with around two dozen people, including Wilfried de Beauclair. Some engineers who worked at the telecommunications facility of the OKW also worked for Zuse as a secondary occupation. Also in 1944 Zuse transformed his company to the Zuse KG (Kommanditgesellschaft, i.e. a limited partnership) and planned to manufacture 300 computers. This way he could also request additional staff and scientists as a contractor in the Emergency Fighter Program. Zuse's company also cooperated with Alwin Walther's Institute for Applied Mathematics at the Technical University of Darmstadt.

To prevent it from falling into the hands of the Soviets, the Z4 was evacuated from Berlin in February 1945 and transported to Göttingen. The Z4 was completed in Göttingen in a facility of the Aerodynamische Versuchsanstalt (AVA, Aerodynamic Research Institute), which was headed by Albert Betz. But when it was presented to scientists of the AVA the roar of the approaching front could already be heard, so the computer was transported with a truck of the Wehrmacht to Hinterstein in Bad Hindelang in southern Bavaria, where Konrad Zuse met Wernher von Braun.

By 1947 it was possible for constants to be entered by the punched tape.

Use after World War II
In 1949, the Swiss mathematician Eduard Stiefel, after coming back from a stay in the US where he inspected American computers, visited Zuse and the Z4. When he formulated a differential equation as a test, Zuse immediately programmed the Z4 to solve it, Stiefel decided to acquire the computer for his newly founded Institute for Applied Mathematics at the ETH Zurich. It was delivered to ETH Zurich in 1950.

Today, the Z4 is on display in the Deutsches Museum in Munich.

In 1950/1951, the Z4 was the only working digital computer in Germany, and the second digital computer in the world to be sold, beating the Ferranti Mark 1 by five months and the UNIVAC I by ten months, but in turn being beaten by the BINAC (although that never worked at the customer's site). Other computers, all numbered with a leading Z, were built by Zuse and his company. Notable are the Z11, which was sold to the optics industry and to universities, and the Z22.

In 1955 the Z4 was sold to the French-German Research Institute of Saint-Louis (Institut franco-allemand de recherches de Saint-Louis) in Saint-Louis, close to Basel, and in 1960 transferred to the German Museum in Munich.

The Z4 was used for calculations for work on the Grande Dixence Dam.

Specifications
 Frequency: (about) 40 Hz
 Average calculation speed: 400 ms for an addition, 3 seconds for a multiplication. Approximately 1000 floating point arithmetic operations on average an hour.
 Programming: holes in 35 mm film stock, punched on a programming machine
 Input: Decimal floating point numbers, punch tape
 Output: Decimal floating point numbers, punch tape or Mercedes typewriter
 Word length: 32 bits floating point
 Elements: (about) 2,500 relays, 21 step-wise relays
 Memory: Mechanical memory from the Z1 and Z2 (64 words, 32 bit)
 Power consumption: (about) 4 kW

See also
 Z1
 Z2
 Z3
 History of computing hardware
 Reverse Polish notation (RPN)
 Stack machine

References

Further reading
 
 
  (178 pages)
 
 
   (1+1+16 pages)

External links
 zuse.de homepage from Horst Zuse (son of Konrad Zuse) with much information about the Zuse computers
 zuse.de {English} English homepage from Horst Zuse (son of Konrad Zuse)
 Pictures of the Z4 at the ETH Zürich (with German text)
 
 

1940s computers
Electro-mechanical computers
Mechanical computers
Z04
German inventions of the Nazi period
Computer-related introductions in 1945
Konrad Zuse
Computers designed in Germany
Serial computers